Xestocoris is a genus of dirt-colored seed bugs in the family Rhyparochromidae. There are about six described species in Xestocoris.

Species
These six species belong to the genus Xestocoris:
 Xestocoris adustus Cervantes & Brailovsky, 2008
 Xestocoris clavatus Cervantes & Brailovsky, 2008
 Xestocoris collinus (Distant, 1893)
 Xestocoris nitens Van Duzee, 1906
 Xestocoris punctatus Cervantes & Brailovsky, 2008
 Xestocoris tibialis O'Donnell, 2007

References

Rhyparochromidae
Articles created by Qbugbot
Pentatomomorpha genera